Phone Zaw Han is a former mayor of Myanmar's second largest city, Mandalay. He was concurrently appointed as the mayor of Mandalay and chairman of the Mandalay City Development Committee. He also became the minister for Development of the Mandalay Region in Thein Sein's Government.

Han is known for his legacy of development and for building roads and infrastructure in the Mandalay region.

References

Mayors of Mandalay